Antonio Pischedda (died 20 August 2018) was an Italian politician who served as a Senator from 1992 to 1994.

References

1942 births
2018 deaths
People from Sassari
20th-century Italian male actors
20th-century Italian politicians
Italian Socialist Party politicians
Senators of Legislature XI of Italy
Deaths from cerebrovascular disease